Josip Landeka (born 28 April 1987) is a retired professional footballer who played as midfielder. Born in Germany, he represented Croatia at under-19 international level.

Early life
Landeka was born in Offenbach, West Germany on 20 April 1987.

Club career
Landeka was with 1. FSV Mainz 05 II from July 2006 to June 2008. He scored two goals in 28 matches during the 2006–07 season and a goal in 27 matches during the 2007–08 season. He was with the first team for the 2007–08 season. However, he didn't make any appearances. He then joined Stuttgarter Kickers for the 2008–09 season. He scored three goals in 23 appearances. He then moved on a free transfer to Wehen Wiesbaden prior to the 2009–10 season. He failed to score any goals in 11 league appearances and one German Cup appearance. He also failed to score any goals in nine appearances for the reserve team.

Career statistics

Notes

External links
 

1987 births
Living people
Sportspeople from Offenbach am Main
Footballers from Hesse
German people of Croatian descent
Association football midfielders
German footballers
Croatian footballers
Croatia youth international footballers
1. FSV Mainz 05 II players
Stuttgarter Kickers players
Stuttgarter Kickers II players
SV Wehen Wiesbaden players
FC Carl Zeiss Jena players
Chemnitzer FC players
SV Darmstadt 98 players
SG Sonnenhof Großaspach players
3. Liga players
Regionalliga players